Martin Nosek (born 26 January 1987) is a Slovak footballer who plays as a defender for FC Hradec Králové.

External links
MFK Dubnica profile 

1987 births
Living people
Slovak footballers
FK Dubnica players
MFK Ružomberok players
FC Hradec Králové players
Slovak Super Liga players
Association football defenders
Expatriate footballers in the Czech Republic
People from Ilava
Sportspeople from the Trenčín Region